The Burnett Act of 1913 was sponsored by United States Representative John L. Burnett (Democrat) of Alabama. It authorized $40 million in spending on new government buildings in the District of Columbia and in smaller towns across the nation.

References

1913 in American law
62nd United States Congress
United States federal legislation
History of Washington, D.C.